S. gracilis may refer to:
 Sageretia gracilis, a shrub species with slightly shiny dark green leaves and yellow-green flowers
 Sarcocystis gracilis, a parasitic protozoan species in the genus Sarcocystis infecting dogs
 Saurida gracilis, the gracile lizardfish, a fish species found in the Indo- pacific region
 Scaphispatha gracilis, a plant species endemic to South America
 Sellosaurus gracilis, a prosauropod dinosaur species of Triassic Europe
 Senoculus gracilis, a spider species in the genus Senoculus found from Guyana to Argentina
 Sepiadarium gracilis, a cuttlefish species native to the Indo-Pacific
 Sillago gracilis, the trumpeter whiting, a fish species
 Sloanea gracilis, a plant species endemic to Suriname
 Smilodectes gracilis, an adapiformes primate species from the early Eocene
 Smilodon gracilis, the slender smilodon, an extinct carnivorous mammal species
 Spartina gracilis, the alkali cordgrass, a plant species
 Sphodromantis gracilis, a praying mantis species found in the Transvaal
 Spilogale gracilis, the Western spotted skunk
 Spratelloides gracilis, the slender sprat, a sprat fish species
 Stemonoporus gracilis, a plant species endemic to Sri Lanka
 Streptocephalus gracilis, a crustacean species endemic to South Africa
 Syrnolopsis gracilis, a gastropod species

Synonyms
 Scaphyglottis gracilis, a synonym for Scaphyglottis prolifera
 Segestria gracilis, a synonym for Segestria florentina
 Slabberina gracilis, a synonym for Eurydice pulchra

See also
 Gracilis (disambiguation)